George Ferguson (5 January 1872 – 1898) was a Scottish footballer who played in the Football League for Bolton Wanderers and in the Scottish Football League for Dundee.

References

1872 births
1898 deaths
Scottish footballers
English Football League players
Association football forwards
Dundee Harp F.C. players
Bolton Wanderers F.C. players
Rochdale A.F.C. players
Dundee F.C. players